Mohammad Asif Hasan (born 24 July 1993, in Dhaka), known as Asif Hasan and sometimes by his nickname Mitul, is a Bangladeshi first-class, List A and Twenty20 cricketer since the 2014–15 Bangladeshi cricket season. Asif is a right-handed batsman and a left-arm orthodox spin bowler. He is currently (July 2016) playing for Dhaka Metropolis.

In February 2018, he took a hat-trick, bowling for Legends of Rupganj against Sheikh Jamal Dhanmondi Club in the 2017–18 Dhaka Premier Division Cricket League.

In October 2018, he was named in the squad for the Dhaka Dynamites team, following the draft for the 2018–19 Bangladesh Premier League.

References

1993 births
Living people
Bangladeshi cricketers
Dhaka Metropolis cricketers
Bangladesh South Zone cricketers
Chattogram Challengers cricketers
Kala Bagan Cricket Academy cricketers
Brothers Union cricketers
Legends of Rupganj cricketers
Cricketers from Dhaka